La Voz (Spanish for The Voice) is a Mexican singing competition television series broadcast on Azteca Uno. The show originally premiered September 11, 2011 on Las Estrellas. It is based on the format of The Voice of Holland originated in the Netherlands and part of the international franchise The Voice created by television producer John de Mol.

Mexico was the first Spanish-speaking country to adapt this format and the first among 6 globally. The series' first episode scored a rating of 28.2/47.1, surpassing Spanish-language TV series La Academia rating of 9.6/17.

The last series produced by Televisa had Lele Pons as host and Maluma, Anitta, Carlos Rivera and Natalia Jiménez as jury. In 2019, the license of The Voice format was acquired from Televisa to TV Azteca. A new edition was announced for this season under a different title (La Voz instead of La Voz... México) with the leadership of Jimena Pérez and with Ricardo Montaner, Yahir, Belinda and Lupillo Rivera as coaches. 

La Voz! TV Azteca loses contract and broadcasting rights The problems presented in the last season of the reality show prompted the production to break the contract for new editions. TV Azteca, which announced in November 2022 that it would no longer have the rights to the La Voz singing contest, so the last seasons in all their versions were the last we will see at Azteca UNO.

Program 
The oficial website says of the program:

This program has already become a very famous, because unlike other programs so far, this is divided into three parts and the artist do not have to be locked up almost half a year with teachers in a school.

Format 

The series consisted of three phases: Blind audition, Battle phase, and Performance shows. Four judges/coaches, all noteworthy recording artists, choose teams of contestants through a blind audition process (12 members in season 1-3 & 5–7, 16 in season 4, 51 in season 8 and 42 in season 9 and 39 in season 10, 30 on season 11). After being acquired by TV Azteca in season 8, the show featured the Blind auditions, Knockouts, Battles and Performance Shows.

First Phase – The Blind Auditions 

Each judge has the length of the auditioner's performance (about one minute) to decide if he or she wants that singer on his or her team; if two or more judges want the same singer (as happens frequently), the Singer has the final choice of coach. In the seventh season, the block button was featured where a coach could prevent another coach from getting a contestant.

Second Phase – The Knockouts 

In the eight season, the second phase was changed from the Battles to the Knockouts. In this phase three artists (two from Season 11) from the same team sing an individual song and their coach chooses the winner. The two (one from Season 11) losing artist(s) are available to 'steal' by the other three coaches.

Third Phase – The Battles 

The Battles were moved to the third stage after season 8. The Battle Rounds remained the same with coaches having two of their artists battle against each other directly by singing the same song together, with the coach choosing which artist advances to the Performance Shows. The losing artist is available to 'steal' by the other three coaches.

Fourth Phase – The Performance Shows 

In the Performance Shows, each artist competes to receive their coach's and public's vote. The artists with the highest votes from their team advance to the next round. This repeats throughout the show until the Finale, where one artist per team is voted as the Top 4. In the Finale, the highest voted artist wins the title as their country's The Voice, along with their coach.

Coaches and hosts

The show premiered on September 11, 2011, with Espinoza Paz, Alejandro Sanz, Lucero, Aleks Syntek as coaches and Mark Tacher as host. For season two, Jacqueline Bracamontes was announced as the replacement of Tacher. Jenni Rivera, Miguel Bosé, Paulina Rubio, and Beto Cuevas were announced as coaches. In August 2013, it was announced that Marco Antonio Solís, Alejandra Guzmán, David Bisbal and Wisin & Yandel would be the coaches in the third season. For the fourth season, Yuri, Julión Álvarez, Laura Pausini and Ricky Martin took over the coaching panel. For season five, after a three-season absence, Sanz returned as a coach alongside new coaches Gloria Trevi, J Balvin, and a double chair for the frontmen of Los Tigres del Norte. For the sixth season, Pausini and Yuri returned after a one-season absence joined by Maluma and Carlos Vives which premiered on October 15, 2017. After five seasons as host, Bracamontes was replaced by YouTube figure Lele Pons for season seven. Maluma was announced to return for his second season, and was joined by new coaches Anitta, Carlos Rivera, and Natalia Jiménez.

In December 2018, TV Azteca acquired the show's rights. The first coach confirmed was Belinda, followed by Yahir, Ricardo Montaner and Lupillo Rivera. Season eight premiered on March 13, 2019, on the new channel with Jimena Peréz as host. On January 21, 2020, it was announced that Belinda and Montaner would be joined by María José and Christian Nodal to coach the participants in season nine. A month later, Eddy Vilard and Sofía Aragón were confirmed as new hosts, replacing Jimena Peréz. Filming for the tenth season started in February 2021, revealing María José as the only coach returning, alongside Miguel Bosé who coached in season two, and debuting coaches, Edith Márquez, and Jesús Navarro. In April 2022, it was revealed that David Bisbal would return for the eleventh season, alongside new coaches Yuridia, Ha*Ash, and Joss Favela.

Coaches' gallery

Coaches' teams 

 – Winning coach and contestant. Winners are in bold.
 – Runner-up coach and contestant. Final contestant first listed.
 – 3rd place coach and contestant. Final contestant first listed.
 – 4th place coach and contestant. Final contestant first listed.

Series overview 
Warning: the following table presents a significant amount of different colors.

Seasons' summaries

Season 1

Season 2

Season 3

Season 4

Season 5

Season 6

Season 7

Season 8

Season 9

Season 10

Season 11

References

m
Mexican reality television series
2011 Mexican television series debuts
Las Estrellas original programming
Azteca Uno original programming
Mexican television series based on Dutch television series